Valeriya Chepsarakova is a Russian Women's Freestyle Wrestler who won the gold medal at the 2013 European Wrestling Championships in the 48 kg weight division defeating Yana Stadnik of Great Britain 1-0, 1-0.

References

1989 births
Living people
Russian female sport wrestlers
Universiade medalists in wrestling
Universiade bronze medalists for Russia
Medalists at the 2013 Summer Universiade
21st-century Russian women